The Galster Wilderness Park Nature Center is a small museum and educational center set in Galster Wilderness Park, a  wilderness park located on the north slope of the San Jose Hills in the San Gabriel Valley, California.  It is operated by the San Gabriel Mountains Regional Conservancy in partnership with the City of West Covina, California.

The center is named after Emil S. and Gladys Galster, who deeded the park to the City of West Covina in 1971.  Emil and Gladys Galster stipulated that the park will always remain a wilderness park and be available for educational use to scouting organizations. 

Galster Wilderness is one of the last remaining native plant communities of  Southern California Black Walnut Woodlands, Juglans californica trees, which grow on the north slope of the San Jose Hills.   Besides the non-natives, coastal sage scrub dominates the remainder of the park.

See also
California chaparral and woodlands ecoregion

External links
 Official Galster Wilderness Park Nature Center website
The San Gabriel Mountains Regional Conservancy: website

San Gabriel Valley
Parks in Los Angeles County, California
Nature centers in California
Parks in Southern California
1971 establishments in California
Protected areas established in 1971